Oxera is a genus of flowering plants in the family Lamiaceae native to Vanuatu and New Caledonia in the western Pacific.

Description
Species of Oxera show a variety of growth forms, including lianas, shrubs and trees. The leaves are simple, and are petiolate (on short stalks), except in O. sessilifolia, with entire or occasionally sinuate (wavy) edges.

The inflorescences are loose thyrses of flowers, growing from leaf axils (axillary) or directly from the stem (cauliflory). The flowers are large, conspicuous and bisexual; the calyx is actinomorphic (rotationally symmetrical), but the corolla is zygomorphic, sometimes strongly so. Although some species have four stamens in each flower, they are usually reduced in number with two stamens, usually the posterior pair, forming staminodes instead.

Distribution
Twenty of the twenty-one species are found on the island of Grande Terre (the main island of New Caledonia). Three species occur on the adjacent island of Île des Pins, two on Lifou and one on Maré in the Loyalty Islands, and two on Vanuatu (including one introduced species).

Oxera vanuatuensis is only known from Vanuatu, where it is only known from cultivated specimens. Villagers on Pentecost Island (and their descendants on Maewo call the tree harongmau, and propagate the species by planting seeds, transplanting seedlings or taking cuttings. The plant is thought to treat illnesses caused by black magic, and profuse flowering from the trunk is thought to foretell a good harvest of yams.

Species
Twenty-one species are recognised in the genus Oxera, in five informal species groups:

baladica group
Oxera baladica Vieill.
Oxera sessilifolia Dubard
Oxera subverticillata Vieill.
Oxera vanuatuensis de Kok – Vanuatu
robusta group
Oxera coriacea Dubard
Oxera coronata de Kok
Oxera palmatinervia Dubard
Oxera robusta Vieill.
pulchella group
Oxera balansae Dubard – Grande Terre, Île des Pins, Lifou 
Oxera brevicalyx (Moldenke) de Kok
Oxera crassifolia Virot 
Oxera morierei Vieill.
Oxera pulchella Labill. 
sulfurea group
Oxera gmelinoides S. Moore
Oxera microcalyx Guillaumin
Oxera rugosa Guillaumin
Oxera sulfurea Dubard – Grand Terre, Île des Pins, Lifou, Maré
macrocalyx group
Oxera glandulosa Vieill. – New Caledonia, Île des Pins
Oxera neriifolia (Montrouz.) Beauvis. 
Oxera macrocalyx Dubard 
Oxera oreophila Guillaumin

Taxonomic history
The genus Oxera was erected by Jacques Labillardière in 1824, based on a single specimen that he had collected in New Caledonia. The closest relative of Oxera is the genus Faradaya, and the two genera were once united as the tribe Oxereae. Collectively, they are the sister group to a clade containing Clerodendrum and a number of segregate genera such as Kalaharia, Huxleya, Amasonia and Tetraclea. Both genera are now treated as members of the subfamily Teucrioideae, following work published by Philip D. Cantino in 1992.

Notes

References

Lamiaceae
Lamiaceae genera
Flora of New Caledonia
Flora of Vanuatu
Taxonomy articles created by Polbot